Phulbari is a village situated in Chitwan district of Nepal. At the time of the 2011 Nepal census it had a population of 3,862 people (1,791 male; 2,071 female) living in 945 individual households.

References

Populated places in Chitwan District